"I'll Be Sweeter Tomorrow (Than I Was Today)" (also known as "I'll Be Sweeter Tomorrow") is a 1967 hit single by the O'Jays, the group's best-selling single on Bell Records.

Chart performance and background
In 1967, "I'll Be Sweeter Tomorrow (Than I Was Today)", reached No. 66 on the Billboard Hot 100 pop chart and was also a Top 10 Billboard R&B hit, peaking at # 8.
The single's B-side, " I Dig Your Act", was also a popular regional hit.  This song, in addition to featuring O'Jays members Eddie Levert, William Powell, and Walter Williams, also featured a fourth original member, Bobby Massey, on vocals. (The fifth original O'Jay, Bill Isles, left the group in 1965, before the group recorded for Bell Records).

Track listing
 "I'll Be Sweeter Tomorrow"
 "I Dig Your Act"

Instrumentation
Strings and some soul feel in the song are the instrumentation, as well as the feel of the fadeout.

Other versions
The O'Jays re-recorded the song for their final album, ''The Last Word."

Artists to cover the song include: 
Linda Jones
Joe Bataan
The Escorts
Beau Dollar & the Dapps.

References

External links

The O'Jays songs
1967 singles